Steve Marriott: All Too Beautiful is the official biography of Steve Marriott, the singer, guitarist and frontman of the Small Faces (1965–1969) and Humble Pie (1969–1975).

All Too Beautiful was written by Paolo Hewitt, a former NME journalist and music critic, and John Hellier, a self-professed lifelong fan and widely recognised expert on the Small Faces and Steve Marriott.

The hardback edition was first published in the UK by Helter Skelter in 2004 and has since been available in a paperback edition too.

Overview
All Too Beautiful is a biography that provides in-depth detail and analysis on all aspects of Steve Marriott's life, both professional and personal, which no other publication has done before. From his family's working-class background, the circumstances surrounding his premature birth in East Ham Hospital, East London on 30 January 1947, the biography documents the many twists and turns of his life until his sudden death on 20 April 1991.

The hardback edition contains never before published black and white photographs, many of which come from his family's private collection, including Marriott seen as a baby, toddler, teenager and also during his time in Small Faces and Humble Pie. There are also images of his childhood homes in Strone Road and Daines Close, the hospital where he was born, his school report from Monega Junior School in Manor Park, and his family, his children, wives and bands.

Reading this book, it becomes obvious that Marriott's family, especially his mother Kay, had a lot of input and provided much first-hand information to the authors. However, Kay and the family feel that they were misquoted and in fact 'used' by the authors to support the author's misconceptions. As well as Kay, there are many direct quotes about the man, from his younger sister (also named Kay), his childhood friends, musicians who worked with him in the 1960s–70s-80s and early 1990s, former wives and his children. The book also dispels many myths and half-truths that have circulated for years – for example, his place of birth, which is often incorrectly given as Bow or Stepney.

The book is written by two self-confessed, lifelong fans of the Small Faces and Steve Marriott. Paolo Hewitt, a music critic and journalist, has written or been involved with several other publications about the Small Faces and other high-profile music groups including The Jam. John Hellier runs a fanzine and website dedicated to Marriott and the Small Faces.  Although much of the book could be said to be written in a fan type way, it is not biased in the subject's favour.  The authors stick to the facts and confidently and sensitively approach the sometimes less than complimentary aspects of Marriott's personality and do not pull punches, as to have done any less would be doing Marriott and his fans a disservice. For example, Marriott, after many years of substance abuse, became quite schizophrenic. At his very worst, often after alcohol and drug binges and several days with no sleep, he was said to become a violent alter-ego, Melvin the bald-headed wrestler. Also documented is Marriott's lifelong naturally hyper and generally good-natured, cheeky, mischievous nature that sometimes gradually manifested into mania and spitefulness.

To the end of his life, Marriott denied that he had an addiction problem with drugs; his denial was probably to save his children and elderly parents from worrying about him. According to interviews and quotes mentioned in the book, band members and his first wife Jenny Rylance claimed that cocaine and alcohol, from the early 1970s at least, certainly played a large part in Marriott's life. His marriage in May 1967 to Jenny was said to have been one of the happiest times of his life and when she left him due to his drug and alcohol problems in 1974, he was arguably never the same again, and for a while fell into a spiral of self-destruction. He was always a workaholic and would think nothing of spending days in his recording studio without sleeping or eating.

As with many musicians, Marriott was at heart often insecure about his musical talents and abilities. He was also said to be insecure about his looks and lack of height, despite the fact that in Britain from 1965 to 1969 he was a much-photographed teen idol, regularly appearing on the front of teen and music publications, and was a much-copied style icon. In many ways his later "larger than life" personality was seen by those who knew him best, a self-defence, a barrier he put up to hide these insecurities. On the flip-side, Marriott at his best was highly creative, talented, intelligent and naturally quick-witted and upbeat. He was undeniably a talented musician and songwriter and scored many chart hits, and it is often said that although in later years he was for the most part virtually forgotten, throughout his music career he remained true to himself and never sold out.

All Too Beautiful also details how and why Marriott never received royalties for any of his songs, and was constantly ripped off by the big record companies and mafia-type managers such as Don Arden. After the demise of Humble Pie, he was left with nothing to show for his efforts and returned to England penniless, yet owing thousands of pounds in taxes; in fact, during much of his life he often had very little to show for his years of success. He eventually decided to shun the big-money contracts that always promised much but delivered little. Older and wiser and with health problems, he decided to keep things simple, playing mostly the pubs and clubs in England where his music career had first begun. He would say that as long as he could carry on writing his songs and playing his music to an appreciative audience, no matter the venue, he was happy; he argued that no big money meant no big hassles; he wanted to keep things simple. The last days leading up to his death are also documented in detail, as well as the aftermath described by his devastated family, friends and colleagues.

The back of the book also catalogs all the known song releases and re-releases ever recorded by Marriott, including guest appearances and collaborations.

Mistakes
All Too Beautiful... has been criticized by some for some mistakes and inaccuracies, and is said to take some of Marriott's own jokes about his life as fact. For example, there is no record of Marriott burning down his school - which previously had been attributed as one of Marriott's many wind-up stories. However, the authors here take it as verbatim. It is stated that their second studio album, Small Faces was released on 24 June 1967; it was released the previous day, on 23 June. Other errors include the misquotations of song lyrics.

Authors
Music journalist Paolo Hewitt has written several notable rock biographies, including those on Small Faces, Oasis, The Jam and Paul Weller. He is a lifelong Marriott admirer. 
John Hellier is also a self-confessed lifelong fan of Steve Marriott and the Small Faces, has run a Small Faces fanzine called The Darlings of Wapping Wharf Launderette for several years, and is involved with the yearly Small Faces convention held in London.

See also
The Moments
Small Faces
Small Faces discography
Humble Pie
Steve Marriott
Steve Marriott discography

Notes

External links
independent book review
independent book review
independent book review
independent book review
The official Steve Marriott website
The Darlings of Wapping Wharf Laundrette website (run by John Hellier)
British Library Catalogue
Humble-Pie-Net – Steve Marriott, Small Faces and Humble Pie information

Biographies about musicians
2004 non-fiction books
2005 non-fiction books
British biographies